This is a list of lighthouses in Kenya.

Lighthouses

See also
List of lighthouses in Somalia (to the north-east)
List of lighthouses in Tanzania (to the south)
 Lists of lighthouses and lightvessels

References

External links

Kenya
Lighthouses
Lighthouses
Lighthouses